Jacob F. Yeager (January 27, 1841 - November 13, 1909) was an American soldier who fought in the Union Army during the American Civil War. He was awarded the Medal of Honor for his actions at Buzzard's Roost.

Biography 
Yeager was born on 27 January 1841 in Pennsylvania. He fought in the 101st Ohio Infantry during the war. Jacob F. Yeager died on 13 November 1909 and is now buried at Greenlawn Cemetery, Tiffin, Ohio.

Medal of Honor Citation 
For extraordinary heroism on 11 May 1864, in action at Buzzard's Roost, Georgia. Private Yeager seized a shell with fuse burning that had fallen in the ranks of his company and threw it into a stream, thereby probably saving his comrades from injury.

Date Issued: 3 August 1897

References 

1841 births
1909 deaths